ADOIT is an enterprise architecture management tool that provides functionalities and methods for enterprise analysis, design, planning, and implementation. The platform supports alignment and improvement of dependencies between business and IT as well as manages and analyses the dependencies between different organizational assets. The EA suite ADOIT is based on various international standards such as TOGAF, ArchiMate, ITIL, and COBIT. It is ArchiMate 3.1 and TOGAF-9 certified. Developed by the BOC Group, ADOIT represents the company's second flagship product along with their business process management and analysis tool, ADONIS NP.



History 
The first version of ADOIT was introduced in 2003 by the BOC Group.

In 2013, ADOIT was additionally made available as ADOIT Community Edition freemium.

In January 2022, ADOIT 14.0 was released and is currently the latest version available.

Application scenarios and features 
ADOIT is used for the optimization of enterprise architectures. It covers a wide application field from the establishment of EA know-how, the definition and implementation of architectural principles, the establishment of business capability management, installation of compliance and IT risk management, to the integration of process management initiatives.

The tool provides options for role-based access, automated and user-specific notifications and warnings, team collaboration, as well as tailored views and reports. The EA suite can be integrated with other tools and technologies such as the BPM suite ADONIS, ServiceNow Live Connector, and others. All ADOIT EA scenarios are available in the web client using HTML 5.

Awards and recognitions 

 Positioned in the "Leaders" quadrant for the 2021 Gartner Magic Quadrant for Enterprise Architecture Tools.
 Named a "Leader" in The Forrester Wave: Enterprise Architecture Management Suites, Q1 2021 by Forrester Research.
 Selected as a 2021 "Customers' Choice" tool in the Gartner Peer Insights 'Voice of the Customer': Enterprise Architecture Tools report.
 Ranked above average across all use cases in the 2021 Gartner Critical Capabilities report.
 Featured in the 2020 Forrester Now Tech report.
 Recognized as "top of the class" in the Market Study by Fraunhofer.

References

External links 

 ADOIT
 ADOIT Community Edition
 BOC Group
 ADOIT Gartner Peer Insights Reviews

Enterprise architecture
Enterprise modelling
Enterprise architecture frameworks